Jarquez Hunter (born December 29, 2002) is an American football running back for the Auburn Tigers.

Early years
Hunter attended Neshoba Central High School in Philadelphia, Mississippi where he was Mr. Football for the state of Mississippi as a senior. Hunter was rated a 3 star recruit coming out of high school and was the nations 44th ranked running back recruit. Hunter committed to play college football at Auburn University over Mississippi State and Iowa.

College career
As a freshman, Hunter was Auburn's #2 running bank behind Tank Bigsby. In the Tiger's week 2 game against Alabama State, Hunter set a Auburn record for the longest rush in program history with a 94 yard touchdown rush. He finished the 2021 season with 593 yards on 6.7 yards per carry.

References

External links
https://auburntigers.com/sports/football/roster/jarquez-hunter/17938

Living people
Players of American football from Mississippi
American football running backs
Auburn Tigers football players
2001 births